Carmela Carabelli, born Carmelina Negri (Melegnano, May 9, 1910 – Milan, November 25, 1978), better known as Mamma Carmela (in English: Mother Carmela), was a spiritual daughter of Pio of Pietrelcina and a famous Italian mystic. She is described as an "apostle of Divine Mercy," as is Faustina Kowalska.

Biography

Early life
Carmelina Negri was born in the May 9, 1910, the daughter of Gaetano Negri and Teresa Galbiati.

She was integrated in the Catholic Action movement, in which, through its enormous enthusiasm and eventually influenced by some members of her family, who accompanied her on the growth of living the faith in the spirit of prayer, the love for Jesus in the Eucharist, the devotion to the Virgin Mary and service to the Catholic Church.

In 1926, she completed her studies and began work in a bank. She met Giuseppe Carabelli, a virtuous and modest young man whom she married on January 23, 1935. They had both always wanted a large family who could convey the "Good News" of a higher love, like that of God. Within her large family she came to be called by the diminutive and tender name of "Mamma" Carmela.

In mid-September 1950, Carmela Carabelli made a trip to the convent of San Giovanni Rotondo where she met the supposedly stigmatized Capuchin friar and priest Padre Pio of Pietrelcina. She defined this trip as being "memorable" and it further increased her love for prayer and desire to do good. Carabelli became soon after one of Padre Pio's spiritual daughters.

In January 1957, the first signs of disease were seen in her husband. In March 1959, Giuseppe Carabelli died. The Archbishop of Milan, Cardinal Giovanni Montini (later Pope Paul VI) pointed out the virtues of this unique and uplifting man, giving him his blessing.

Mystic life
On March 14, 1968, thirty years after the death of Mary Faustina Kowalska and in the year when the process of beatification of this nun was formally opened by the Vatican, Carabelli felt an "interior call" in her heart. From then until her death, she reported several interior locutions received directly from Jesus Christ, while "Merciful Jesus" and Our Lady under the title of "Mother of Divine Love".

Spiritual writings

Carabelli in her spiritual writings revealed her interior locutions with Jesus in which he allegedly supplied some mysteries about his life, about God the Father as the father of all mankind; about the Virgin Mary, who in turn spoke on the person of Joseph, among other divine mysteries. Through this privileged personality, Carabelli began to travel the world. Her writings were already translated into major languages and distributed in several countries.

In a letter from Pietro Santoro, Bishop of Termoli and later Archbishop of Campobasso-Boiano, addressed to the publication Fidelitas on January 9, 1972, he says of the spiritual writings of Carabelli: "These writings are truly rich in faith and holy ardor for the Divine Cause (...) Her books will do much good to humanity that feels increasingly tormented and who lives far from God."<ref>Extract of a letter from Monsignor Pietro Santoro, 'Fidelitas, January 9, 1972)</ref> In the previous year, he had already granted ecclesiastical approval nihil obstat and imprimatur, certifying Carmela's writings as being in accord with the moral doctrine of the Catholic Church.

Death and burial
In October 1978, Carabelli suffered serious health problems but recovered in hospital in Milan. However, the following month, after receiving the sacrament of Holy Viaticum, on November 25, 1978, she died. She is buried in the Monumental Cemetery of Milan (Section 72 B, ref. 1855).

Further reading
 Carmela Carabelli; The Message of Merciful Love - Conversations With Jesus, Divine Mercy Publications, Australia
 Carmela Carabelli; Jesus, Our Teacher (from the writings of Mamma Carmela) - volumes 1 to 10, Divine Mercy Publications, Australia
 Carmela Carabelli; Mary, Mother and Teacher (from the writings of Mamma Carmela) - volumes 1 to 10, Divine Mercy Publications, Australia
 Carmela Carabelli: Thoughts and Reflections -'' volumes 1 to 6, Divine Mercy Publications, Australia

See also
 Visions of Jesus and Mary

References

External links
 Mamma Carmela Carabelli: List of books published

1910 births
1978 deaths
20th-century Christian mystics
Italian Christian mystics
Italian women writers
Italian Roman Catholics
Visions of Jesus and Mary
Roman Catholic mystics
Burials at the Cimitero Monumentale di Milano